This is a list of World Aquatics Championships medalists in water polo.

Men

Medalists by tournament
Abbreviation and legend

 * – Host team
 † – Defunct team
 (C) – Captain
 (GK) – Goalkeeper
 (LH) – Left-handed

Multiple gold medalists

Multiple medalists

Women

Medalists by tournament
Abbreviation and legend

 * – Host team
 (C) – Captain
 (GK) – Goalkeeper
 (LH) – Left-handed

Multiple gold medalists

Multiple medalists

See also
 Water polo at the World Aquatics Championships
 List of World Aquatics Championships men's water polo tournament records and statistics
 List of World Aquatics Championships women's water polo tournament records and statistics
 List of world champions in men's water polo
 List of world champions in women's water polo
 List of Olympic medalists in water polo

Notes

References

Sources

External links
 Official website of the FINA

Medalists
World Aquatics Championships
Water polo